Percy McDermott Chalmers (16 March 1896 – 22 June 1987) was an Australian rules footballer who played with Fitzroy in the Victorian Football League (VFL).

Notes

External links 

1896 births
1987 deaths
Australian rules footballers from Victoria (Australia)
Fitzroy Football Club players